Captain Henry de Beauvoir Tupper AM (7 April 1883 – ?) was a Royal Navy officer and recipient of the Albert Medal.

Early life
Henry de Beauvoir Tupper joined the Royal Navy after leaving Framlingham College, and was on 1 July 1902 posted as a midshipman to the pre-dreadnought battleship HMS Revenge, serving in home waters.

First World War
He served in the First World War, rising to the rank of commander and was in command of  during the Gallipoli landings in April 1915.

While later serving on  during the First World War, he performed an act for which he was awarded, on 21 February 1919, the Albert Medal for gallantry in saving life at sea (later replaced by the George Cross). He was awarded it jointly with Able Seaman ET Spalding. The citation reads as follows:

References

People educated at Framlingham College
Recipients of the Albert Medal (lifesaving)
1883 births
Year of death missing
Royal Navy officers of World War I